The Dream Chapter: Star (stylized The Dream Chapter: STAR) is the debut extended play by South Korean boy band TXT, released by Big Hit Entertainment and Republic Records, and distributed by iriver Inc on March 4, 2019, in both digital and physical versions.

Background 
TXT was first announced in January through a series of videos revealing the members one by one. On February 22, the tracklist for the debut album was released. On March 4, TXT held their debut stage on Mnet performing their debut single " (Crown)", "Blue Orangeade" and " (Nap of a star)".
On April 7, the lyric video of the promo single "Blue Orangeade" was published on Big Hit's YouTube Channel. Subsequently, a music video for the official follow-up second single "Cat & Dog" was released on April 25 at midnight KST on the same channel. The digital promo single "Our Summer (Acoustic Mix)" was announced and released on May 31, with a ten-hour notice from Big Hit Entertainment's official Twitter account. Without any prior announcement, on June 5 a music video for the third single "Nap of a star" was released on Big Hit's YouTube channel.

Track listing 
Credits adapted from Tidal.

Notes
   'One Day Horns Grew From My Head'
   'Nap of a Star'
 denotes an additional producer

Personnel 
Credits adapted from NetEase Music and Tidal.

 TXT – vocals, background vocals , gang vocals 
 Adora – background vocals , vocal arrangement , recording engineer , digital editing 
 Supreme Boibackground vocals , gang vocals , vocal arrangement , additional instrumentation and programming , recording engineer , digital editing 
 Moonshinebackground vocals 
 Melanie Joy Fontanabackground vocals 
 Jung Myeong-hoonbackground vocals 
 Collin'background vocals 
 Kim Hyun-junggang vocals 
 Im Ji-yeongang vocals 
 Yang Hee-jugang vocals 
 Kim Ji-yeongang vocals , recording engineer 
 Slow Rabbitvocal arrangement , keyboard , synthesizer , additional ryhthm programming , recording engineer , digital editing 
 El Capitxnvocal arrangement , digital editing , recording engineer 
 Lee Tae-wookguitar 
 The Futuristicsall instrumentation and programming 
 Daniel "June Nawakii" Celestinkeyboard , synthesizer 
 Lelsynthesizer , background vocals , vocal arrangement , digital editing 
 Jung Jae-pilguitar 
 Park Jin-serecording engineer , digital editing 
 Jung Woo-yeongrecording engineer , digital editing 
 Michel “Lindgren” Schulzrecording engineer 
 Phil Tanmixer 
 Yang Gamixer 
 Jaycen Joshuamixer 
 Hector Castillomixer 
 Bill Zimmermanassistant mixer 
 Jacob Richardsassistant mixer 
 Mike Seabergassistant mixer 
 DJ Rigginsassistant mixer 
 Carlos Imperatoriassistant mixer

Charts

Weekly charts

Year-end charts

Accolades

Music program awards

Certifications and sales

References 

2019 debut EPs
Korean-language EPs
Tomorrow X Together albums
Hybe Corporation EPs
Republic Records EPs